José Miguel Azevedo Cardoso (born 28 May 1972), known as Miguel Cardoso, is a Portuguese football manager.

Career

Early career
Born in Trofa, Cardoso graduated in Physical Education and Sports with specialization in football in 1995 and concluded a Masters in Sports Science in 1998 in the College of Sports Science and Physical Education at the University of Porto. He started his coaching career in 1993, taking over S.C. Espinho's under-12 squad.

Cardoso joined FC Porto in 1996, initially as Fernando Freitas' assistant in the under-10 team. He later progressed through the club's youth setup, becoming a fitness coach of the B-team in 1999, and being appointed in charge of the under-15s in 2003.

In April 2004, Cardoso moved to C.F. Os Belenenses and became the first team's fitness coach. On 10 May 2006, he followed former Belenenses manager Carlos Carvalhal to S.C. Braga, with the same role.

In September 2007, Cardoso was named Domingos Paciência's assistant at Associação Académica de Coimbra. He continued to work as Paciência's second man at Braga, Sporting CP and Deportivo de La Coruña.

Shakhtar Donetsk
On 12 June 2013, Cardoso was presented at FC Shakhtar Donetsk, being appointed manager of the under-21 squad while also working as a coordinator for the club's youth setup. Ahead of the 2016–17 season, he became Paulo Fonseca's assistant at the first team.

Cardoso left Shakhtar on 8 June 2017.

Rio Ave
On 12 June 2017, Cardoso was appointed at the helm of Primeira Liga club Rio Ave F.C., replacing departing Luís Castro. After achieving three wins and a draw against S.L. Benfica in his first four matches in charge, he was awarded the "Manager of the Month" for August.

Cardoso led Rio Ave to a best-ever campaign in the top flight, finishing fifth (the club's best-ever position shared with the 1981–82 season under Félix Mourinho), winning 51 points (beating the 50 reached by Pedro Martins in 2015–16) and achieving qualification to the UEFA Europa League.

Nantes
On 13 June 2018, Cardoso was appointed as manager of French Ligue 1 side FC Nantes, replacing Claudio Ranieri. He left the club on 2 October, after only obtaining six points in eight league matches.

Celta
On 12 November 2018, Cardoso took over La Liga side RC Celta de Vigo, in the place of sacked Antonio Mohamed. He gained international attention for his first press conference, in which he accidentally said that he was the manager of their rivals Deportivo de La Coruña. The following 3 March he too was dismissed, with the Galicians a place and two points above the relegation zone.

AEK Athens
On 28 May 2019, Cardoso was appointed as head coach of Greek Super League side AEK Athens, replacing Manolo Jiménez on a two-year deal. He was fired on 25 August after just four matches, his third dismissal in twelve months.

Rio Ave
After over a year out of work, Cardoso returned to Rio Ave on 29 January 2021, on an 18-month deal. His team came 16th, and had to face F.C. Arouca in a play-off for top-flight survival. They lost 5–0 on aggregate; between the two games the termination of his employment was informally arranged, and he was barred from the training ground.

Managerial statistics

References

External links
 

1972 births
Living people
Sportspeople from Trofa
Portuguese football managers
Primeira Liga managers
Rio Ave F.C. managers
Ligue 1 managers
FC Nantes managers
RC Celta de Vigo managers
Super League Greece managers
AEK Athens F.C. managers
FC Shakhtar Donetsk non-playing staff
Portuguese expatriate football managers
Portuguese expatriate sportspeople in Ukraine
Portuguese expatriate sportspeople in France
Portuguese expatriate sportspeople in Spain
Expatriate football managers in Ukraine
Expatriate football managers in France
Expatriate football managers in Spain
Expatriate football managers in Greece